HMS Welshman was an  of the Royal Navy, launched in September 1941. During World War II she served with the Home Fleet carrying out minelaying operations, before being transferred to the Mediterranean Fleet in mid-1942 for the Malta Convoys. She also saw service during Operation Torch. The ship was torpedoed and sunk off Tobruk by the German submarine  on 1 February 1943, with the loss of 157 lives.

Service history

Home Fleet, 1941–1942
Commissioned in late August 1941, Welshman sailed to Scapa Flow to join the Home Fleet, before assignment to the 1st Minelaying Squadron at the Kyle of Lochalsh in September. She conducted minelaying operations in the waters off western Scotland before being detached in December for deployment in the Bay of Biscay.

After a refit, Welshman resumed minelaying operations in the Bay of Biscay in April.

Force H, 1942–1943
In May 1942 she sailed to the Mediterranean to join Force H in the Malta Convoys. On 8 May Welshman sailed from Gibraltar disguised as a French destroyer, with 240 tons of stores and RAF personnel aboard, in "Operation Bowery". She was sighted by enemy aircraft the next day, but her deception succeeded. On entering the Grand Harbour at Malta on 10 May she detonated two mines with her paravanes, sustaining some damage. She returned to Gibraltar on 12 May, and sailed to the UK for repairs at Yarrows at Scotstoun, returning to Gibraltar at the end of the month.

On 11 June Welshman  sailed for Malta as part of the relief convoy in Operation Harpoon. The next day she left the convoy and proceeded alone. After discharging her cargo at Malta on 15 June she rejoined the convoy which was under heavy attack from Axis aircraft and Italian warships. The next day she returned to Malta with the two surviving merchant ships and their escort. The ship then returned to Gibraltar, and then to Scotstoun for repairs.

On 13 July the ship rejoined Force H at Gibraltar, sailing for Malta once again in Operation Pinpoint the next day. She arrived at Malta on 16 July and returned to Gibraltar on 21 July, despite attempts by Italian ships and aircraft to intercept her.

In August she took part in another fiercely contested Malta convoy, Operation Pedestal. She arrived on 16 August, then was transferred to the Eastern Mediterranean in September. In October she made another voyage to Malta with Force H, delivering aircraft in Operation Train and returning to Gibraltar on 2 November. Welshman then supported the Allied landings in North Africa in Operation Torch. In December she conducted minelaying operations off Haifa.

In January 1943 Welshman transported stores, including 150 tons of seed potatoes, to Malta before carrying out minelaying operations in the Skerki Channel, across the Axis evacuation route from Tunisia. She also transferred troops from Beirut to Famagusta, Cyprus.

Sinking
Two hours later she sank east of Tobruk in position , with the loss of 155 lives.

References

Bibliography
 
 

Abdiel-class minelayers
Ships built on the River Tyne
1940 ships
World War II minelayers of the United Kingdom
Ships sunk by German submarines in World War II
World War II shipwrecks in the Mediterranean Sea
Maritime incidents in February 1943